S33 may refer to:

Aviation 
 Blériot-SPAD S.33, a French airliner
 Letov Š-33, a Czechoslovak bomber
 Madras Municipal Airport, in Jefferson County, Oregon, United States
 Short S.33, a British flying boat
 Sikorsky S-33 Messenger, an American sesquiplane
 Spectrum S-33 Independence, an American business jet

Naval vessels 
 
 , a torpedo boat of the Imperial German Navy
 
 , a submarine of the United States Navy

Other uses 
 S33 (Long Island bus)
 S33 (ZVV), a line of the Zürich S-Bahn
 County Route S33 (Bergen County, New Jersey)
 S33: Take precautionary measures against static discharges, a safety phrase
 Section 33 of the Canadian Charter of Rights and Freedoms
 Sotho language
 Sulfur-33, an isotope of sulfur
 S33, a postcode district in the Hope Valley, Derbyshire, England